Serhiy Volodymyrovych Tretyak (born 7 September 1963) is a retired Ukrainian professional footballer. Tretyak made his professional debut in the Soviet First League in 1982 for SKA Odessa. In 1992 Tretyak moved to Israel, accepting a 6-year contract from Beitar Jerusalem. He retired in 2001 and then worked for more than ten years as the manager of Beitar's youth team, he also worked as the assistant manager in the senior team from 2006 to 2009.

In 1983 Tretyak took part in the Summer Spartakiad of the Peoples of the USSR in the team of Ukrainian SSR.

Honours
Chornomorets Odesa
USSR Federation Cup: 1990

Beitar Jerusalem
Israeli Premier League: 1992–93, 1996–97, 1997–98
Toto Cup: 1997–98

References

External links
 
 

1963 births
Living people
Sportspeople from Kherson
Soviet footballers
Ukrainian footballers
Israeli people of Ukrainian descent
Ukraine international footballers
FC Krystal Kherson players
SC Odesa players
FC Chornomorets Odesa players
Beitar Jerusalem F.C. players
Soviet Top League players
Soviet First League players
Soviet Second League players
Ukrainian Premier League players
Ukrainian expatriate footballers
Expatriate footballers in Israel
Ukrainian expatriate sportspeople in Israel
Association football defenders